Milica "Mila" Mulroney (Serbian Cyrillic: Милица "Мила" Пивнички; née Pivnički; born July 13, 1953) is the wife of the 18th Prime Minister of Canada, Brian Mulroney. She was notable for taking on a greater role during her husband's tenure than previous spouses of Canadian prime ministers, for her work for children's charities, and for criticism of her lavish spending habits.

Early life
Mulroney was born Milica Pivnički to Serbian Orthodox parents Dimitrije "Mita" Pivnički and Bogdanka (née Ilić) in Sarajevo, PR Bosnia-Herzegovina, FPR Yugoslavia. Her first years were spent in the city of Sarajevo where her father practised medicine. In 1956, Dr. Pivnički took a research fellowship position at the Royal Victoria Hospital's Allan Memorial Institute of Psychiatry in Montreal. While his pregnant wife Bogdanka waited to join him, she moved with young Milica back to their hometown of Novi Bečej, Serbia. Finally, two years later, in 1958, she and their two children (five-year-old Milica and one-year-old Jovan) emigrated to Canada and joined Dimitrije in Montreal. Mila, the elder child, studied engineering at Concordia University, but did not graduate.

At age 19, she married Brian Mulroney, then a 34-year-old lawyer, on May 26, 1973. Both were involved with the Progressive Conservatives (PC) in Westmount. They have one daughter, Caroline, and three sons, Ben, Mark, and Nicolas. Their youngest child, Nicolas, was born while the family was living in 24 Sussex Drive.

During Brian Mulroney tenure 
Mila was a radical change from the wives of recent prime ministers — the feminist Maureen McTeer and the "wild child" Margaret Trudeau. Being a housewife, she greatly appealed to that demographic, especially in her responses to criticism from prominent feminists (including, in 1987, remarks from Sheila Copps). Many PC campaign buttons featured both Mulroney's face and hers, and Ontario Premier Bill Davis commented to Brian, "Mila will get you more votes for you than you will for yourself."

She assumed a greater role than many Prime Ministers' wives while Mulroney was in office, campaigning for several children's charities. Her role, which some claimed was trying to become a "First Lady," was criticized (especially when she hired a personal office and staff and for her lavish redecoration of the Prime Minister's residence). Her frequent shopping sprees became tabloid fodder, with some in the press dubbing her "Imelda" for her love of shoes (she had over 100 pairs).  In her book On the Take, Stevie Cameron accused Mila of trying to sell her old furniture to the government for much more than its value.

After Brian Mulroney tenure 
Mila Mulroney is former celebrity patron of the Canadian Cystic Fibrosis Foundation and of Astral. In 2019, she was knighted in Serbia by Ivica Dačić (Knight of the St. Sava Order of Diplomatic Pacifism).

See also
 Spouse of the prime minister of Canada

References

1953 births
Living people
Brian Mulroney
Concordia University alumni
Canadian people of Serbian descent
Canadian people of Bosnia and Herzegovina descent
Mulroney family
Naturalized citizens of Canada
People from Montreal
Serbs of Bosnia and Herzegovina
Spouses of prime ministers of Canada
Yugoslav emigrants to Canada
Knights of the St. Sava Order of Diplomatic Pacifism